Tongi Pilot School & Girls College is situated in Auchpara, Tongi, Gazipur Sadar Upazila, Gazipur District, Bangladesh. It is one of the oldest schools in Gazipur District. In 1947 the school section was established, then in 1991 girls college section was opened.

The principal is Mohammad Alauddin Miah.

References

External links

Tongi
Schools in Gazipur District